No Parking on the Dance Floor is an album by American vocal band Midnight Star, released on June 6, 1983. The album contains the singles "Freak-A-Zoid", "Wet My Whistle", "Electricity" and "No Parking (On the Dance Floor)", as well as the seminal quiet storm anthem, "Slow Jam". Of all of the group's albums, it is their most successful, in which it achieved the highest chart placings on the U.S. Billboard 200 and R&B albums charts, as well as in New Zealand, where it peaked at No. 30.

Track listing
"Electricity" - (Reggie Calloway, Bill Simmons)  6:58
"Night Rider" - (Jeff Cooper, Melvin Gentry, Belinda Lipscomb, B. Simmons, Bo Watson)  4:40
"Feels So Good" - (Kenneth Gant, B. Lipscomb)  4:23
"Wet My Whistle" - (Reggie Calloway) 5:06
"No Parking (On the Dance Floor)" - (Vincent Calloway, Bobby Lovelace, Simmons)  4:27
"Freak-A-Zoid" - (Reggie Calloway, V. Calloway, B. Simmons)  8:06
"Slow Jam" - (Kenneth Edmonds, Lipscomb, B. Watson)  4:17
"Playmates" - (B. Lipscomb, B. Simmons, B. Watson)  4:10

Charts

Singles

References

External links
 Midnight Star-Headlines at Discogs
 

1983 albums
Midnight Star albums
SOLAR Records albums